Andrew Jackson Waterman (June 23, 1825 – October 4, 1900) was a lawyer and Attorney General of Massachusetts.

Early life
Waterman was born to William and Sarah (Bucklin) Waterman in North Adams, Massachusetts on June 24, 1824.

Waterman was a delegate to the Republican National Convention of 1864.

References

Footnotes

1825 births
1900 deaths
People from North Adams, Massachusetts
Massachusetts lawyers
Massachusetts Attorneys General
19th-century American lawyers